Vernègues is a commune in the Bouches-du-Rhône département in southern France.

The commune is made up of two villages: Vernègues and Cazan.

On 11 June 1909 an earthquake killed two villagers and destroyed the castle in Vernègues and most of the houses. The village was later rebuilt at a lower altitude.

Population

See also
 Communes of the Bouches-du-Rhône department

References

External links
 Official site of Vernègues - Cazan  (includes history and photos of the ruins)

Communes of Bouches-du-Rhône